The 2009 Individual Long Track/Grasstrack World Championship was the 39th edition of the FIM speedway Individual Long Track World Championship.

The world title was won by Gerd Riss of Germany for the eighth time.

Venues

Final Classification

References 

2009
Speedway competitions in the Czech Republic
Speedway competitions in France
Speedway competitions in Germany